Treasureflower is a common name for several plants in the genus Gazania that are cultivated as ornamentals. Treasureflower may refer to:

Gazania linearis
Gazania rigens